The 2006–07 Coppa Italia was the 60th edition of the tournament. The final was played, like the two previous editions, between Internazionale and Roma. The first match was played in Rome on 9 May 2007, and the second leg in Milan on 17 May 2007. The score from the first leg was a 6–2 win for Roma, while in the second leg Inter beat Roma 2–1, which crowned Roma cup winners for the eighth time.

Formula
The match format was first introduced in the 2005–06 season.  Participating in the competition were all the teams from Serie A (20 teams) and B (22 teams), 28 teams from Serie C1 and C2, and 2 teams from non professional leagues ("Dilettanti"), 72 teams in total. The first three rounds were all one-game matches, with the lower classified team in the previous year playing at home.  Only 64 teams participated in the first round; the eight teams from Serie A that qualified for European competitions joined the competition in the fourth round – the round of 16.  Once the third round was finished, only 8 of the original 64 teams survived and these teams were paired against the 8 teams that had not yet participated. From this point on, the rounds, including the final, were all double leg home and away with the team having the higher aggregate score advancing.

Pairing Teams
No draws were made to pair the teams. In the first round, seed 72 played seed 9, seed 71 played seed 10 and so on. In the second and all future rounds, all brackets were fixed with no reseeding in case of upset winners.  To see how teams were paired in the second round, assume no upsets and the top seed would again play the bottom seed; seed 40 (or its opponent seed 41) would play seed 9 (or its opponent seed 72), 39 (or 42) would play 10 (or 71) and so on.

Seeding teams
Seeding was allocated as follows:

a) seed 1 to last year's Italian Cup Winner

b) seeds 2–8 to the participants playing in the Champions League/UEFA Cup competitions other than seed 1.  If less than 8 teams are participating then the next highest placed Serie A team(s) complete(s) the list.

c) seeds 9–17 to the 9 remaining Serie A teams to 17th place.

d) seeds 18–20 to the 3 Serie B teams promoted to Serie A this season.

e) seeds 21–23 to the 3 Serie A teams demoted to Serie B this season.

f) seeds 24–37 to the 14 Serie B teams finishing to 17th place but not promoted to Serie A, and seed 38 to the play-out winner in Serie B

g) seeds 39–42 to the 4 Serie C1 teams promoted to Serie B this season.

h) seeds 43–46 to the 4 Serie B teams demoted to Serie C1 this season.

i) seeds 47–70 to 24 teams from Serie C1 and Serie C2 as selected by the league

j) seeds 71–72 to 2 teams from the Lega Nazionale Dilettanti (below C2) as selected by the league.

Preliminary rounds

Top quarter

Second quarter

Third quarter

Bottom Quarter

Knockout stage

Top team in each pairing played first leg at home

Final

First leg 
All times CEST.

Second leg 

Roma won 7–4 on aggregate.

Top goalscorers 

* After Extra Time
** After Penalty Shootout
(a) Advances on Away-Goals Rule

References

rsssf.com

2006-07
Italy
Coppa Italia